Nenad Dimitrijević (born 23 February 1998) is a Macedonian professional basketball player for UNICS Kazan of the VTB United League. He is also a regular member of the North Macedonia national basketball team. Standing at 6 ft 3 in (1.90 m), he plays at the point guard position.

Professional career
On 19 June 2021, he signed with Valencia of the Spanish Liga ACB, after playing five seasons with fellow Spanish club Joventut Badalona.

References

External links
 Ненад Димитријевић, велики кошаркашки таленат 
 Gigantes.com video
 Streetball.com

1998 births
Living people
BC UNICS players
Joventut Badalona players
Liga ACB players
Macedonian expatriate basketball people in Spain
Macedonian men's basketball players
Macedonian people of Serbian descent
Point guards
Sportspeople from Skopje
Valencia Basket players